Qud or QUD may refer to:
 Kichwa language, a Quechuan language with ISO 639-3 code qud.
 Qud Tolmush, a village in the Ardabil Province of Iran
 QUD, regional airport code for Damanhur, Egypt
 Quds Force, a special unit of the Iranian Revolutionary Guards aiming at Al-Quds (Jerusalem).
 Qud, Fictional Location in Caves of Qud

See also 
 Al-Quds (disambiguation)